bin Laden is an Arabic language surname synonymous with Osama bin Laden (1957–2011); it may also pertain to the Saudi Binladin Group, a holding company for the assets of the bin Laden family, and other notable members of Osama's family.

People
Osama bin Laden (1957–2011), Saudi terrorist
Abdallah bin Laden (born 1976), Saudi businessman and son of Osama bin Laden
Ashin Wirathu, Burmese Buddhist monk labeled "Burmese Bin Laden" for religious intolerance towards Muslims.
Bakr bin Laden, Saudi businessman and half-brother of Osama bin Laden
Hamza bin Laden (1989 –  2019), Saudi al-Qaeda figure and son of Osama bin Laden
Mohammed bin Awad bin Laden (1908–1967), Saudi businessman who amassed the bin Laden family fortune, father of Osama bin Laden
Omar bin Laden (born 1981), Saudi son of Osama bin Laden
Saad bin Laden (1979–2009), Saudi al-Qaeda figure and son of Osama bin Laden
Salem bin Laden (1946–1988), Saudi former head of the bin Laden family and brother of Osama bin Laden
Tarek bin Laden (born 1947), Saudi businessman and half-brother of Osama bin Laden
Wafah Dufour (née bin Laden, born 1975), American model and niece of Osama bin Laden
Yeslam bin Ladin (born 1950), Swiss businessman and the half-brother of Al-Qaeda leader
General Bin Laden, former Liberian warlord

Other uses
Osama bin Laden (elephant), an elephant that killed at least 27 people in India from 2004 to 2006
"Bin Laden" (song), a 2005 hip hop song by Immortal Technique and Mos Def
bin Laden, a nickname for the 500 euro note

Arabic-language surnames